The 1996 NCAA Division I Men's Golf Championship was the 58th annual NCAA Division I Men's Golf Championship to determine the individual and team national champions of men's collegiate golf. The tournament was held at the Honors Course in Ooltewah, Tennessee from May 29 to June 1, 1996. 

The team championship was won by the Arizona State Sun Devils who captured their second national championship by three strokes over the UNLV Rebels. The individual national championship was won by Tiger Woods from Stanford.

Venue

This was the first NCAA Division I men's golf championship hosted at the Honors Course in Ooltewah, Tennessee. The tournament would be played at Ooltewah again in 2010. This was the fourth NCAA golf championship played in Tennessee; the others were in 1934 (at the Cleveland Country Club in Cleveland, Tennessee), 1955 (at the Holston Hills Country Club in Knoxville, Tennessee), and 1965 (again in Knoxville).

Results

Team championship

Individual championship

References

NCAA Men's Golf Championship
Golf in Tennessee
NCAA Division I Men's Golf Championship
NCAA Division I Men's Golf Championship
NCAA Division I Men's Golf Championship
NCAA Division I Men's Golf Championship
NCAA Division I Men's Golf Championship